This is a list of the NCAA indoor champions in a long sprint event.  Generally that was the 440 yard dash until 1983, and the 400 meters being contested thereafter.  The event was not held in 1986 and 1987.  Hand timing was used until 1975 and in 1980, starting in 1976 fully automatic timing was used.

Champions
Key
y=yards
w=wind aided
A=Altitude assisted

440 Yards

400 Meters

References

GBR Athletics

External links
NCAA Division I men's indoor track and field

NCAA Men's Division I Indoor Track and Field Championships
Indoor track, men